The 1930 All-Eastern football team consists of American football players chosen by various selectors as the best players at each position among the Eastern colleges and universities during the 1930 college football season.  

Fullback Leonard Macaluso of Colgate and center Ben Ticknor of Harvard were the only two players selected by all four major selectors.

All-Eastern selections

Quarterbacks
 Albie Booth, Yale (AP-1, UP-1 [hb], INS-1)
 William H. Morton, Dartmouth (UP-1)
 Edward Baker, Pittsburgh (NEA-1)

Halfbacks
 Bart Viviano, Cornell (AP-1, UP-1)
 Hewitt, Columbia (AP-1)
 Cornelius Murphy, Fordham (INS-1)
 Bill Tanguay, NYU (INS-1)
 J. Leslie Hart, Colgate (NEA-1)
 Jack Grossman, Rutgers (NEA-1)

Fullbacks
 Leonard Macaluso, Colgate (AP-1, UP-1, INS-1, NEA-1)

Ends
 Paul Riblett, Penn (UP-1, INS-1)
 Herster Barres, Yale (AP-1)
 Carlmark, Army (AP-1)
 Nemack, NYU (UP-1)
 Messinger, Army (INS-1)
 Stanley Yudicky, Dartmouth (NEA-1)
 John Orsi, Colgate (NEA-1)

Tackles
 Jack Price, Army (AP-1, UP-1, NEA-1)
 Foley, Fordham (AP-1)
 Blimp Bowstrom, Navy (UP-1)
 John Goodwillie, Dartmouth (INS-1)
 George A. Ellert, Syracuse (INS-1)
 Newton, Syracuse (NEA-1)

Guards
 Frederick J. Linehan, Yale (AP-1, UP-1, INS-1)
 Henry Wisniewski, Fordham (UP-1, INS-1, NEA-1)
 Gabriel Bromberg, Dartmouth (AP-1, NEA-1)

Centers
 Ben Ticknor, Harvard (AP-1, UP-1, INS-1, NEA-1)

Key
 AP = Associated Press
 UP = United Press
 INS = International News Service, selected by INS writer James L. Kilgallen
 NEA = Newspaper Enterprise Association

See also
 1930 College Football All-America Team

References

All-Eastern
All-Eastern college football teams